Cogetinci is a settlement in the Municipality of Cerkvenjak in northeastern Slovenia. It lies in the Slovene Hills northeast of Cerkvenjak. It was first mentioned as Czogendorf in an urbarium from the Archbishopric of Salzburg dating to 1321. The area is part of the traditional region of Styria and is now included in the Drava Statistical Region.

A small chapel-shrine in the settlement dates to the late 19th century.

Notes

External links
Cogetinci on Geopedia

Populated places in the Municipality of Cerkvenjak